St. James' Church is a former Collegiate church in Antwerp, Belgium. The church is built on the site of a hostel for pilgrims to Santiago de Compostela. The present building is the work of the Waghemakere family and Rombout Keldermans, in Brabantine Gothic style. The church contains the grave of Peter Paul Rubens in the eastern chapel.

History

From 1431 on, even before the church was built, the chapel on this site was a stop on the route to the burial place of Saint James the Great in Santiago de Compostela. In 1476 the chapel became a parish church so plans were made to replace the modest building with a large church.
Fifteen years later, in 1491, construction of the late Gothic church started. It was not completed until 1656, when Baroque architecture was in vogue. Fortunately throughout all those years the architects closely followed the original Gothic design, hence the consistent Gothic exterior. The interior, however, is decorated in Baroque style.

The plans at the start of the construction, in a time when Antwerp was on its way to becoming one of the most important economic hubs in Europe, were very ambitious.

Unfortunately, due to the decline of the city from the mid-16th century on, financial problems eventually caused construction to be halted after the tower had reached just one third of its planned height.

Although the original interior was destroyed during the iconoclastic storms of 1566 and 1581, the Baroque 17th-century interior is well preserved thanks to a priest who pledged allegiance to the French revolutionaries, who had just invaded the city. In return, he was rewarded by being permitted to choose one church in Antwerp which would not be plundered, and chose St. James', thus saving the interior. Many of the original stained-glass windows were unfortunately destroyed during World War II.

Among the Baroque interior decorations are the carved wooden choir stalls, created between 1658 and 1570, the opulent main altar (1685) and the communion rails of the holy chapel (1695). The central pulpit was created in 1675 by Lodewijk Willemsens.

Stations of the Cross 
The serie of sculptures (I, II, IV, VIII, IX, XII, XIII) executed by Joseph Geefs, the other by P. J. De Cuyper was consecrated in 1855 and was gifted by several noble houses.
st station of Passion - gifted by Joannes Dircx, Priest and dean
nd station of Passion - gifted by Carolus Geelhand
rd station of Passion - gifted by Daniel Thuret
th station of Passion - gifted by Louis Giles de Pelechy
th station of Passion - gifted by anonymous
th station of Passion - gifted by Charles de Brouchoven de Bergheyck and Emily Moretus
th station of Passion - gifted by Jacob della Faille, Lord mayor
th station of Passion - gifted by Theodore Moons van der Straelen
th station of Passion - gifted by Leo Philippe, Knight de Burbure
th station of Passion - gifted by Charles-emannuel Blondel d'Hamale
th station of Passion - gifted by anonymous
th station of Passion - gifted by Joannes de Meeûs
th station of Passion - gifted by anonymous
th station of Passion - gifted by Rochus de Backer, alderman

Other notable events 
Rubens married on 6 December 1630 in Saint James to Hélène Fourment.
Cardinal Danneels was consecrated in this church by Cardinal Leo Joseph Suenens in 1977.

Organs 

The old organ has a rich history: it was played by many famous people, among them Henry Bredemers. The Choir organ, built by J.B. Forceville in 1727, is also original, including the still functioning mechanical action.
The hew grand organ was built in 1884 by Anneesens, in Romantic style.

Burials 
In the 16th, 17th and 18th century St. James' Church was the parish church of Antwerp's prominent citizens, several of whom built private burial chapels in the church. In the church numerous important gravestones are still inside, most belonging to the nobility. There are more than 1300 graves inside the church, and dates of burials of more than 4500 persons. Some graves are of very high quality, famous is the grave of Francisco Marcos de Velasco made by Pieter Scheemaeckers, Ludovicus van Anthoine made by Willem Ignatius Kerricx and Henrica Carolina Adriana Josepha van Cornelissen and Eugenia Catherina van Ertborn both sculpted in marble by Guillaume Geefs.
The most famous is that of Antwerp's renowned painter Peter Paul Rubens, completed five years after his death in 1640. The painting above Rubens' tomb is by the master himself.

Rubens family 
 Peter Paul Rubens and Helena Fourment.
 Daniel Fourment, died 1643: marr. Clara Stappaert: father in law of Peter Paul Rubens.

 François I , son of Peter Paul Rubens: alderman of Antwerp in 1659, marr. Suzanne Charles.
 Alexander Josephus Rubens, Grandson of Peter Paul Rubens. Marr. Catherina Philippine de Parys, Philip Constant de Parys, Alexander Jacob de Parys, Joannes Bapt. de Parys, Isabella Alexandrine de Parys, Frans Frederic, Count of Respani.
 Albert I Rubens, son of Peter Paul Rubens, marr. Clara del Monte.
 Clara IV Joanna, lady of Merksem, daughter of Peter Paul Rubens. Marr. Philip Constant de Parys, Catharina Franscica Rubens
 Nicolas Piqueri, died 1661: Almoner of Antwerp, marr. in 1627 to Elisabeth Fourment.
 Ghisbert van Colen, marr. Mary Fourment, niece of Helena.
 Emmanuel van Hoorebeeck, Son of Henry and Joanne Fourment.
 Ferdinand Helman, (1550–1617): father in law of Nicolaas Rubens, Lord of Rameyen. marr. Catharine vander Veken.

General

References

External links

Jame
Jame
Peter Paul Rubens
Roman Catholic churches in Antwerp
17th-century Roman Catholic church buildings in Belgium